German submarine U-997 was a Type VIIC/41 U-boat built for Nazi Germany's Kriegsmarine for service during World War II.
She was laid down on 7 December 1942 by Blohm & Voss, Hamburg as yard number 197, launched on 18 August 1943 and commissioned on 23 September 1943 under Oberleutnant zur See Hans Lehmann.

Design
Like all Type VIIC/41 U-boats, U-977 had a displacement of  when at the surface and  while submerged.

U-997 was fitted with three anti-aircraft guns, five  torpedo tubes (four on the bow and one on the stern) and fourteen torpedoes. Its complement was between forty-four and sixty.

Sensors

Passive sonar
U-997 was one of only ten Type VIIC's to be fitted with a Balkongerät (literally 'Balcony apparatus or equipment'). The Balkongerät was used on U-boats (and ). The Balkongerät was standard on the Type XXI and the Type XXIII. Nonetheless, it was also fitted to several Type IXs and one Type X. The Balkongerät was an improved version of Gruppenhorchgerät (GHG) (group listening device). The GHG had 24 hydrophones, the Balkongerät had 48 hydrophones and improved electronics, which enabled more accurate readings to be taken.

Service history
The boat's service career began on 23 September 1943 with the 5th Training Flotilla, followed by 12 months active service, with a succession of three flotillas, namely 9th Flotilla on 1 May 1944, then 13th Flotilla on 1 June 1944, and finally with 14th Flotilla on 1 March 1945.

Wolfpacks
U-997 took part in seven wolfpacks, namely:
 Grimm (31 May – 6 June 1944)
 Trutz (17 August – 1 September 1944)
 Grimm (13 September – 1 October 1944)
 Regenschirm (14 – 16 October 1944)
 Panther (16 October – 8 November 1944)
 Stier (21 November – 25 December 1944)
 Hagen (15 – 21 March 1945)

Fate
U-997 was surrendered on 9 May 1945 and was sunk by aircraft on 13 December 1945 in the North Atlantic, in position , as part of Operation Deadlight.

Summary of raiding history

See also
 Battle of the Atlantic

References

Notes

Citations

Bibliography

German Type VIIC/41 submarines
U-boats commissioned in 1944
U-boats sunk in 1945
World War II submarines of Germany
1944 ships
World War II shipwrecks in the North Sea
U-boats sunk by aircraft
Ships built in Hamburg
Operation Deadlight
Maritime incidents in December 1945
Submarines sunk by aircraft as targets